Parotis pyritalis is a moth in the family Crambidae. It was described by George Hampson in 1912. It is found in the Democratic Republic of the Congo (Katanga, North Kivu), Kenya and Mozambique.

References

Moths described in 1912
Spilomelinae